James Richard Bullard (born 23 October 1978) is an English former professional footballer, coach and television personality. He is the co-host of the Saturday morning Sky Sports show Soccer AM.

As a player he was a midfielder and played youth football at West Ham United before moving to Gravesend & Northfleet in 1998. Two seasons at Peterborough United was followed by a spell at Wigan Athletic where he scored ten goals in 145 league appearances, helping them to their first promotion to the Premier League. Bullard was known for being a passionate leader on the pitch and for his funny antics, playing football with a smile throughout his career. Paul Jewell described Bullard as the heart and soul of the dressing room.

A transfer to Fulham in 2006 resulted in six goals in 39 league appearances before Bullard moved to Hull City in 2009. A loan move to Ipswich Town commenced in 2011 where he scored on his debut. He later moved permanently to Ipswich and ended his career at Milton Keynes Dons. On 1 October 2012, Bullard retired from professional football, because problems with his knees meant he was unable to keep up the playing demands of up to two games a week. He was most recently manager at Leatherhead between September 2016 and May 2017.

Club career

Early career
Bullard was born in East Ham, London. He played schools' representative football for Bexley Primary Schools FA and Kent Schools FA whilst at primary school, and then represented North Kent Schools FA whilst a pupil at Erith School. He started his career in non-League football with amateur club Corinthian before moving to Dartford, where he made 26 appearances in the 1997–98 season. He then moved to Gravesend & Northfleet before being signed by the club he supported as a boy, West Ham United, for a fee of £30,000 in 1999. He did not manage to break into the team, however, and was given a free transfer at the end of the 2000–01 season. In May 2001, Bullard signed for Second Division club Peterborough United on a three-year contract. Initially he was on trial but he was offered a permanent deal after impressing manager Barry Fry with his pace, energy and eye for goal. After impressing with Peterborough, Bullard earned a move to Wigan Athletic for £275,000 in January 2003.

Wigan Athletic
Bullard quickly established himself in the Wigan first team and was named in the PFA Division Two Team of the Year for 2002–03. He helped Wigan secure promotion to the FA Premier League in the 2004–05 season and an appearance in the 2006 Football League Cup Final, which they lost 4–0 to Manchester United.

Fulham

On 28 April 2006, it was announced that Bullard would sign for Fulham at the end of the 2005–06 season after a £2.5 million offer from the London club triggered a release clause in his contract. On 16 May, Bullard was officially confirmed as a Fulham player. Bullard's Fulham debut came as the team lost 5–1 to Manchester United on 20 August. His first goal for Fulham came against Bolton Wanderers on 26 August, a last-minute penalty kick to level the scores at 1–1. Three days later, after he scored a  curling free kick against Sheffield United in a 1–0 win, Fulham boss Chris Coleman hailed Bullard as "the best £2million we've ever spent".

On 9 September, Bullard dislocated his kneecap in a match against Newcastle United. This injury was thought to keep him out for six to eight weeks. However three days later it was revealed that Bullard would in fact be out for up to nine months with cruciate knee ligament damage. Fulham's new manager Lawrie Sanchez announced that the midfielder was aiming to return around October 2007. However, he did not make a first team appearance until 12 January 2008, coming off the bench to play against West Ham. Bullard then came on as a half time substitute in a 2–1 win against Aston Villa on 3 February, setting up the equaliser then scoring the winning goal from a  free kick and winning the man of the match award. He scored an identical free kick weeks later, to rescue a point against Blackburn Rovers and keep Fulham's hope of Premier League survival alive.

After missing a large part of the season due to injury, his return to the team, along with club captain Brian McBride, sparked Fulham into a run of form which saw them move out of the bottom three with one game remaining, after a 2–0 victory over Birmingham City. After helping Fulham out of the relegation zone, Bullard vowed to stay at Fulham to remain loyal with the club.

At the start of the 2008–09 season, Bullard found himself being linked with various clubs, with his former club, Wigan, expressing an interest in signing him. However, newly appointed manager Roy Hodgson said that he would not sell Bullard, insisting he was a key player. Bullard claimed he was in talks to sign a new deal with the club. However, this was denied by the club. The uncertainty surrounding Bullard's future at Fulham left him "very confused". Despite being regularly featured in the first team in the first half of the season, it was reported on Sky Sports that Bullard was told by the club that he could leave the club.

Hull City
On 23 January 2009, Bullard completed a move to Hull City for £5 million, a record transfer fee paid by the club. In an interview broadcast on BBC's Football Focus on 31 January, Bullard discussed his reasons for leaving Fulham:

Fulham boss Roy Hodgson said "He's been seeking the type of contract we couldn't give him. I congratulate Hull and Jimmy on getting the contract he wanted. It wasn't just wage demands prompting Jimmy to go, but the length of contract too". Bullard signed a four-and-a-half-year deal with Hull. In 2016, Bullard, having retired by that time, claimed that Hull presented him with a contract containing a "misprint" for 15,000 pounds per week more than what Bullard said was the originally agreed salary of 40,000 pounds per week and he signed on knowing that it was a "misprint."

Bullard made his Hull debut as a substitute in their 28 January match against West Ham, but picked up a knee injury during the game. The injury was to the same knee that he dislocated while at Fulham, but was not initially thought to be related to the prior damage. It was sufficiently serious to necessitate Bullard flying back to the same surgeon, Richard Steadman, in the United States for further knee surgery. On 19 February, it was declared that he would be out for the rest of the season after the cruciate ligament surgery. He returned to action on 6 October, in a reserve team match against Bolton, scoring a long range goal. His first team return was off the bench on 19 October against his old club, Fulham, a 2–0 defeat. He scored his first goal for Hull, a free kick, against West Ham on 21 November. He also scored his second goal for the club in the same game, this time from the penalty spot. His third goal for Hull came against Manchester City, again from the penalty spot. His goal celebration saw him wagging his finger at his Hull teammates who had sat down in a circle, imitating Hull manager Phil Brown's on-pitch team talk from the same fixture the previous season where he sat his team on the pitch for a half-time dressing-down. Amused, Brown himself applauded Bullard's celebration.

Against Aston Villa on 5 December, Bullard went up for an aerial challenge against James Milner and landed awkwardly, injuring his knee.
After a scan it was confirmed that he would be out for six to eight weeks with an injury to the left knee. This came after receiving the player of the month accolade the Friday previous. He made a scoring return in February 2010 for Hull reserves. On 27 March he scored from the penalty spot against former club Fulham, giving Hull the lead in a 2–0 victory. His next penalty came against Sunderland on 24 April, but he hit the post with Hull a goal down receiving jeers from some of the Hull support, who viewed his high transfer fee and wages partly responsible for the club's financial problems. Bullard was substituted at half-time, with Hull needing to win to avoid relegation.

On 27 June, Hull's chairman confirmed that Bullard was available for loan and was free to speak to Celtic. However, Hull officials said on 12 July that Celtic and the player had been unable to reach agreement on his wage demands. The club opted to exclude Bullard from pre-season friendlies to reduce the risk of injury preventing the player's sale. Hull were facing the prospect of administration to tackle the club's heavy debts; they had very little choice but to offload Bullard, who was one of the club's highest earners, in order to raise additional revenue and reduce the club's large wage bill. At the start of 2010–11 Bullard was not given a squad number, but some time later he was handed number 27 and played the full 90 minutes against Derby County, before going on to play in a further three games. Bullard scored a last minute winner against Sheffield United at Bramall Lane on 26 December, returning after an injury.

On 22 July 2011, Bullard was suspended by Hull City following an incident at Hull's training camp in Slovenia the previous week, which was believed to be a breach of the club's alcohol policy. On 18 August, Hull announced that they had terminated Bullard's contract. Bullard received an out of court settlement after the unlawful termination of his contract.

Ipswich Town
On 27 January 2011, he joined Ipswich Town on loan. He scored on his debut in a 2–1 victory at Derby County on 1 February. Hull said his exit saved the club £320,000 in wages, as he had signed a £45,000-a-week contract for them while they were still in the Premier League. Bullard scored five times in 16 appearances for Ipswich. He won the Supporters' Player of the Year award, despite only being with the club for three months. Some supporters called for manager Paul Jewell to sign him on a permanent basis. However, with Bullard's wages being so high at Hull, chances of a permanent move being agreed looked unlikely. On 3 April, Bullard admitted that he would be interested in a move to Ipswich, and that he would be prepared to take a pay-cut.

On 25 August, Bullard joined Ipswich Town on a permanent deal, signing a two-year contract. After starting positively, injuries meant he spent the majority of the remainder of the season on the bench. Bullard was suspended for two weeks while Michael Chopra was fined two weeks wages by the club due to being late to training after a drinking spree. Jewell explained that Bullard and Chopra committed the same offence, but Chopra was suffering from off-the-field issues, therefore it would be inappropriate to suspend him. Jewell highlighted that Bullard "loved playing football and training", deciding that a two-week suspension was the best way to discipline him. Jewell admitted "It's never easy to suspend a player who I have signed twice, who is the life and soul of the dressing room".

After serving his suspension Bullard was reintroduced back into the first team making a number of first team appearances, but was widely used as an impact substitute. Bullard left Ipswich by mutual consent in August 2012; even though he was highly rated by Jewell he was unable to guarantee him regular first-team football.

Milton Keynes Dons and retirement
On 28 August 2012, Bullard signed a short-term contract with Milton Keynes Dons, with a deal running until 31 December, but he announced his retirement from football on 1 October of the same year due to injuries. Bullard said "In the summer I knew I wanted to give it one last crack and show people what I could do, But what I think with my strong head and what I could physically do are two different things. My head tells me I can do it, but my body tells me, no Jim, you can't." The following day, he was reported to have joined non-League side Holland as a player coach, with Holland chairman Mark Sorrell saying: "Jimmy is a family friend and has agreed to help us out. He will take the coaching sessions and will play three or four times a season". However, the deal fell through, with Sorrell saying: "The situation has got right out of hand. Jimmy likes to keep himself to himself and he was just coming down to help us out".

International career
Although English by birth, Bullard has a German grandmother and was therefore eligible for the German national team. In the run-up to the 2006 FIFA World Cup, it was reported that Bullard was contemplating an international call-up from the Nationalmannschaft, having made his interest known to the national coach Jürgen Klinsmann. He was called into the England squad in August 2008 for the 2010 FIFA World Cup qualifiers against Andorra and Croatia in September, but did not feature in either match. He was called up on three occasions.

Managerial career
On 17 September 2016, Bullard was named manager of Isthmian League Premier Division side Leatherhead. He left the club at the end of the season.

Outside football
In 2014 Bullard released his autobiography Bend It like Bullard which told the story of his footballing career and became a best-seller.
Bullard has made a number of appearances as a pundit for BT Sport and the BBC most notably in the 2014 FA Cup final between Arsenal and Hull City, the latter who Bullard had previously played for. In addition Bullard has made multiple television appearances on Soccer AM and Goals on Sunday.

In November 2014, he was announced as a contestant in the fourteenth series of I'm a Celebrity...Get Me Out of Here! Since his exit from the show, Bullard has made special appearances on ITV's annual charity show, Text Santa, The Xtra Factor, Celebrity Juice and Alan Carr's Specstacular.

Alongside comedians Rob Beckett and Ian Smith, Bullard hosted UK television channel Dave's comedy-football podcast The Magic Sponge. The podcast was an irreverent look at the lives of professional footballers and included appearances from guests including Barry Fry, Dean Windass and Lee Hendrie. Bullard now hosts his own fishing podcast and video series Off The Hook with Jimmy Bullard. Bullard has continued to make television appearances in 2015, as a guest on Channel 4's Sunday Brunch and ITV2's Reality Bites and as a pundit on Match of the Day for the FA Cup third round tie between Arsenal and Hull City.

Bullard founded Extra Time Management with his friend and manager James Erwood. Extra Time Management is an organisation which helps professional sports persons who are about to or are already retired from their chosen sport, to open doors to new careers in media and broadcasting. Extra Time Management firstly helps sports persons deal with depression and other mental health issues and then begins to find new careers for their clients. A percentage of the company's commissions is donated to multiple charities.

Bullard was the host's assistant on the first series of ITV comedy panel show Play to the Whistle, starring alongside Bradley Walsh, Frank Lampard and Holly Willoughby. Bullard has co-hosted Sky Sports' Soccer AM since August 2017, initially alongside John Fendley and Lloyd Griffith. As of June 2020, he now co-hosts alongside Fendley, with Griffith having stepped down in July 2019.

Personal life
Bullard is engaged to his long-term girlfriend and has two children.

Career statistics

Honours
Wigan Athletic
Football League Second Division: 2002–03
Football League Championship runner-up: 2004–05
Football League Cup runner-up: 2005–06

Individual

PFA Team of the Year: 2002–03 Second Division, 2004–05 Championship
Premier League Player of the Month: November 2009
Ipswich Town Player of the Year: 2010–11

Filmography

References

External links

Profile at UpThePosh! The Peterborough United Database

1978 births
Living people
Footballers from East Ham
English footballers
Association football midfielders
West Ham United F.C. players
Corinthian F.C. (Kent) players
Dartford F.C. players
Ebbsfleet United F.C. players
Peterborough United F.C. players
Wigan Athletic F.C. players
Fulham F.C. players
Hull City A.F.C. players
Ipswich Town F.C. players
Milton Keynes Dons F.C. players
English Football League players
Premier League players
English football managers
Leatherhead F.C. managers
English people of German descent
Isthmian League players
Isthmian League managers
Southern Football League players
I'm a Celebrity...Get Me Out of Here! (British TV series) participants
Soccer AM